German submarine U-86 was a Type VIIB U-boat of Nazi Germany's Kriegsmarine during World War II.

She was laid down at the Flender Werke in Lübeck on 20 January 1940 as yard number 282. Launched on 10 May 1941, she was commissioned  on 8 July and completed training with the 5th U-boat Flotilla under the command of Kapitänleutnant (Kptlt.) Walter Schug. She was reassigned to the 1st flotilla, initially for further training on 1 September before being ready for operations from 1 December. She stayed with that organization until her loss on 29 November 1943.

U-86 completed eight war patrols with the flotilla, sinking three ships, totalling . She was a member of ten wolfpacks.

She was sunk on 29 November 1943 east of the Azores, in position 40°52'N, 18°54'W, by depth charges from two British warships, HMS Rocket (H92) and HMS Tumult (R11).  50 dead (all hands lost).

Design
German Type VIIB submarines were preceded by the shorter Type VIIA submarines. U-86 had a displacement of  when at the surface and  while submerged. She had two shafts and two  propellers.

U-86 was fitted with five  torpedo tubes (four fitted at the bow and one at the stern), fourteen torpedoes, one  SK C/35 naval gun, 220 rounds, and one  anti-aircraft gun The boat had a complement of between forty-four and sixty.

Service history

First patrol
U-86 departed Kiel on 7 December 1941 for her first patrol. She docked at Brest on the French Atlantic coast on the 22nd where she would be based for the rest of her career.

Second patrol
U-86s second patrol started on 27 December 1941. She damaged the British Toorak on 16 January 1942. On the 18th, she sank the Greek Dimitios G. Thermiotis.

Third and fourth patrols
On her third foray, she left Brest on 25 March 1942. It was relatively uneventful. She returned on 26 May.

Sortie number four began on 2 July 1942. On 6 August, she sank an American sailing ship, the Wawaloam with her deck gun.

Fifth, sixth and seventh patrols
This (fifth) outing was also quiet, starting on 31 October 1942 and finishing on 7 January 1943.

Having left Brest on 24 February 1943, she encountered and sank her final victim, the Norwegian Brant County on 11 March.

U-86s seventh patrol was between 8 July and 11 September 1943.

Eighth patrol and loss
The boat departed Brest for the last time on 11 November 1943.

50 men died; there were no survivors.

Previously recorded fate
U-86 was listed as missing in the North Atlantic from 28 November 1943.

Wolfpacks
U-86 took part in ten wolfpacks, namely:
 Zieten (7 – 22 January 1942) 
 Wolf (13 – 31 July 1942) 
 Natter (6 – 8 November 1942) 
 Westwall (8 November - 16 December 1942) 
 Neuland (4 – 13 March 1943) 
 Dränger (14 – 20 March 1943) 
 Seewolf (21 – 30 March 1943) 
 Without name (11 – 29 July 1943) 
 Schill 2 (17 – 22 November 1943) 
 Weddigen (22 – 29 November 1943)

Summary of raiding history

References

Bibliography

External links

1941 ships
German Type VIIB submarines
Ships built in Lübeck
Ships lost with all hands
World War II shipwrecks in the Atlantic Ocean
U-boats sunk by depth charges
U-boats commissioned in 1941
U-boats sunk by British warships
U-boats sunk in 1943
World War II submarines of Germany
Maritime incidents in November 1943